Ewa Ziętek (born 8 March 1953) is a Polish actress. She has made over 50 appearances in film and television. She starred in the 1978 comedy film What Will You Do When You Catch Me?.

References

External links
 

1953 births
Actors from Katowice
Living people
Polish film actresses
Polish television actresses
20th-century Polish actresses
21st-century Polish actresses